Bushman's Nek Pass is situated in the KwaZulu-Natal province of South Africa on a path to the Sehlabathebe National Park.

Route
The pass starts at the South Africa/Lesotho Border Post which lies at an elevation of 1764m and climbs to 2435m at its summit. The route is suitable only for hiking and horse riding. Motor vehicles and motor cycles are not allowed onto the pass.

See also
Mountain passes of South Africa
KwaZulu Natal Passes

References

Mountain passes of KwaZulu-Natal